François Richier (born on 11 August 1963) is a former Ambassador Extraordinary and Plenipotentiary of Republic of France to India. He was previously the second counsellor at the Embassy of France in Berlin, from 1999 to 2000.

Richier was later the French ambassador to Afghanistan.

References

Living people
Ambassadors of France to India
1963 births